Rudolf Schilberg (29 September 1894 – 30 July 1961) was an Austrian male weightlifter, who competed in the heavyweight category and represented Austria at international competitions.  He competed at the 1928 Summer Olympics and 1936 Summer Olympics. In the heavyweight category he set six world records in the press between 1925 and 1931.

References

1894 births
1961 deaths
Weightlifters at the 1928 Summer Olympics
Olympic weightlifters of Austria
Sportspeople from Vienna
Austrian male weightlifters
Weightlifters at the 1936 Summer Olympics
World record setters in weightlifting
20th-century Austrian people